Días contados (English title: Running Out of Time; literally: Numbered Days) is a 1994 Spanish thriller film directed and written by Imanol Uribe. It features Carmelo Gómez, Ruth Gabriel, Candela Peña, and Javier Bardem, among others. It is based on the novel of the same name by Juan Madrid.

Plot 
Antonio, a brazen, individualistic ETA terrorist, travels with two fellow cell members, Carlos and Lourdes to Madrid, where they intend to carry out a terrorist attack on a police station. Just like Lourdes, with whom he shares a complex romantic liaison, Antonio is caught in a downward spiral of disenchantment and despondency with respect to the organization and the life he has led so far.

He moves into the area under the guise of an unassuming photographer for the press, and finds himself falling for his neighbor, Charo, a naive prostitute with an impending drug problem who is unaware of Antonio's activities. She reciprocates, and Antonio uses her whimsical desire to have their first tryst in Granada as an excuse to flee Madrid right after he shoots a police officer. Meanwhile, matters become complicated when Antonio's identity as a terrorist is made public and Charo's sleazy, drug-addicted acquaintance Lisardo, incidentally an informant, gives Antonio's identity away to corrupt police officer Rafa.

The film ends on a tragical note as the car bomb (containing 100 kg worth of explosives) and the police car carrying Charo haplessly converge in front of the police station. Fuelled by his love, a self-destructive streak, or both, Antonio follows the car to the station gate right as Carlos presses the detonator.

Cast

Production
The film is an Aiete Films and Ariane Films production. Ruth Gabriel was barely eighteen years old at the time of filming. The film argument justified several nudes scenes of the very young actress, who insisted while filming them so that none of the crew members were absent, in order to give the sequences the greatest naturalness.

Reception 

Días contados was nominated for Goya Awards in 19 categories and won for the following:

 Best Actor (Carmelo Gómez)
 Best Director (Imanol Uribe)
 Best Editing (Teresa Font)
 Best Film
 Best New Actress (Ruth Gabriel)
 Best Screenplay – Adapted (Imanol Uribe)
 Best Special Effects (Reyes Abades)
 Best Supporting Actor (Javier Bardem)

See also 
 List of Spanish films of 1994

References

External links 

1994 films
1990s Spanish-language films
Films set in Madrid
Films set in Andalusia
Best Film Goya Award winners
Films featuring a Best Actor Goya Award-winning performance
Films featuring a Best Supporting Actor Goya Award-winning performance
Films shot in Madrid
1994 thriller films
Spanish thriller films
Films about ETA (separatist group)
1990s Spanish films
Films based on Spanish novels